Square Pagoda, translating Chinese Fangta, may refer to:

 Songjiang Square Pagoda in suburban Shanghai
 Baisigou Square Pagoda in Ningxia
 Fangta Park in Songjiang in suburban Shanghai
 Fangta Park in Changshu